The Mispillion River is a river flowing to Delaware Bay in southern Delaware in the United States.

The lower  of the river are considered by the U.S. Army Corps of Engineers to be navigable.

A boardwalk known as the Mispillion Riverwalk follows the river in Milford.  , an effort was underway to preserve a greenway along the river upstream and downstream of Milford.

Variant names and spellings
According to the Geographic Names Information System, the Mispillion River has also been known historically as:

Name origin 

"The first occurrence of this name (of the river) is in the form Mispening on a map of 1664, tentatively analyzed as meaning "as the great tuber (stream);" (Dunlap and Weslager, 1950)

See also

List of Delaware rivers
Mispillion Light
USS Mispillion (AO-105)
USNS Mispillion (T-AO-105)

References 

Rivers of Delaware
Rivers of Sussex County, Delaware
Rivers of Kent County, Delaware
Tributaries of Delaware Bay